Hulstina aridata is a species of moth in the family Geometridae first described by William Barnes and Foster Hendrickson Benjamin in 1929. It is found in North America.

The MONA or Hodges number for Hulstina aridata is 6543.

References

Further reading

 

Boarmiini
Articles created by Qbugbot
Moths described in 1929